The Commander Joint Forces New Zealand (COMJFNZ) is a senior appointment in the New Zealand Defence Force, responsible for the command of Headquarters Joint Forces New Zealand. The COMJFNZ is, in effect, the operational commander of all joint operations and exercises within the New Zealand Defence Force, and reports direct to the Chief of Defence Force. Assisting the COMJFNZ are three service component commanders—the Maritime Component Commander, the Land Component Commander, and the Air Component Commander—who are jointly responsible to the COMJFNZ and their respective service chiefs (the Chief of Navy, Chief of Army, and Chief of Air Force) for the capability, training and operations of personnel and units from their respective services.

The commander and headquarters of Joint Forces New Zealand were established in 2001 under Major General Martyn Dunne. The command was formed in an effort to integrate and centralise command of operational units within the three distinct branches of the New Zealand Defence Force. Joint Forces New Zealand is headquartered at Trentham Military Camp in Upper Hutt. The incumbent COMJFNZ, Rear Admiral James Gilmour, was appointed to the position in November 2018.

Appointees
The following list chronologically records those who have held the post of COMJFNZ, with rank and honours as at the completion of the individual's term.

References

Military of New Zealand